Hollywood Pacific Theatre is a movie theater located at 6433 Hollywood Boulevard in Hollywood, Los Angeles, California, along the famous Hollywood Walk of Fame.

History

Beginnings
Originally known as the Warner Bros. Theatre or Warner Hollywood Theatre, the Italianate beaux arts building was designed by architect G. Albert Lansburgh with approximately 2,700 seats. It opened on April 26, 1928, showcasing the studio's early Vitaphone talking film Glorious Betsy, starring Conrad Nagel and Dolores Costello.

Warner Bros. owned radio station KFWB positioned its radio transmitter towers on top of the building, which remain to this day. Though covered by "PACIFIC" lettering, the original "WARNERS" lettering can still be seen inside each tower.

Renovation for widescreen
In an era when theaters were forced to compete with television by introducing widescreen, the venue was one of the few in Hollywood large enough to convert to Cinerama. After renovations, it reopened on April 29, 1953, as the Warner Cinerama showing This is Cinerama. The new screen was 28 feet by 76 feet with a 146 degree arc, and seating was reduced to approximately 1,500 to accommodate the new screen size. This is Cinerama played for 115 weeks, grossing an L.A. record of $3,845,200. It closed 132 weeks after it opened and on November 15, 1955, Cinerama Holiday opened (after two premieres on the 7th and 14th) and played for 81 weeks, grossing $2,212,600. It was followed by the third Cinerama film, Seven Wonders of the World, which played for 67 weeks, grossing $1,659,361.

In 1961, the theater was equipped to run 70mm films and showed both 70 and 35mm films. The last of the three-strip Cinerama presentations was the American premiere run of How the West Was Won for 93 weeks in 1963 and 1964. In 1968, Stanley Warner sold the theater to Pacific Theatres, which renamed it the Hollywood Pacific Theatre. In the late '60s and early '70s, two Stanley Kubrick films had long runs at the theatre: 2001: A Space Odyssey (1968) played for 80 weeks, and A Clockwork Orange (1971) also had a long run.

On January 31, 1978, the theater closed and two screens were added at a cost of $1.2 million by converting the balcony section into two 550-seat areas as well as equipping the theater with Dolby Stereo. It re-opened on May 26, 1978 with Thank God It's Friday and the re-issue of American Graffiti.

End of use for exhibiting films
The theater finally closed its doors as a full-time cinema on August 15, 1994. This was mostly due to water damage to the basement caused by the construction of the Red Line Hollywood Subway and structural damage caused by the 1994 Northridge earthquake. To date, the balcony sections remain closed off due to structure safety issues. The theater has since been designated a Los Angeles Historic-Cultural Monument.

Influence on Carol Burnett's star on Hollywood Walk of Fame
In the '50s, a young Carol Burnett was working as an usherette when the theater was showing Alfred Hitchcock's Strangers on a Train (1951). Having already seen the film, she advised two patrons arriving during the last 10 minutes of a showing to wait until the beginning of the next showing to avoid spoiling the ending for them. The manager observed Burnett, let the couple in, and then callously fired her, stripping the epaulettes from her uniform. Years later, in the '70s, after achieving TV stardom, when the Hollywood Chamber of Commerce offered her a star on the Hollywood Walk of Fame, they asked her where she wanted it. She replied "Right in front of where the old Warner Brothers Theater was, at Hollywood and Wilcox", which is where it was placed, at 6439 Hollywood Blvd.

Digital Cinema Lab
From 2001 to 2006, it was used by Entertainment Technology Center at USC for experiments in digital projection and dubbed the ETC Digital Cinema Lab in Hollywood, administered by Eduardo Kéith. A new flat screen was installed along with a new JBL sound system. Screenings for Society of Motion Picture and Television Engineers members included I, Robot, Collateral, and Crash.

Current use
The theater was occupied by Ecclesia Hollywood Church until July 2013. Given the recent revitalization of Hollywood Boulevard in the early 21st century, it is often speculated that the theater will one day be restored as a film palace.

References

External links
Warner Bros. Theatre History
Cinema Treasures
Cinema Tour Photos of the Theatre
Movies Played List as Warner Hollywood Theatre

Event venues established in 1928
Cinemas and movie theaters in Hollywood, Los Angeles
California Historical Landmarks
Los Angeles Historic-Cultural Monuments
Hollywood Boulevard